The 2005–06 Alpha Ethniki was the 70th season of the highest football league of Greece and the last season under the name Alpha Ethniki, before then was renamed to Super League Greece. The season began on 27 August 2005 and ended on 13 May 2006. Olympiacos won their second consecutive and 34th Greek title. However, the season was somewhat overshadowed by the suspension of the Greek FA by UEFA, which jeopardized the European places of the Champions League, UEFA Cup, and Intertoto Cup qualifiers from Greece, as well as the use of Athens Olympic Stadium as the site of the 2006–07 Champions League final.

Teams

Stadia and personnel

 1 On final match day of the season, played on 13 May 2006.

League table

Results

Top scorers
Source: Galanis Sports Data

References

External Links
Official Greek FA Site
Greek SuperLeague official Site

Alpha Ethniki seasons
Greece
1